Lleyn sheep are a breed of sheep from the Llŷn peninsula ('Lleyn'), in Gwynedd, north-west Wales.

They are bred for prolificacy, good mothering, quiet in nature, high milk and excellent for white wool. They are suited to both upland and lowland grazing.

This breed is raised primarily for meat.

References 

Sheep breeds
Sheep breeds originating in Wales
Gwynedd
Llŷn Peninsula